Alpha Beta Gamma Delta is the ninth studio album by English rock band the Godfathers, released on 16 September 2022 on their own Godfathers Recordings label. It marks the first Godfathers album to feature the lineup of singer and founding member Peter Coyne with new members Jon Priestley (bass), Richie Simpson (guitar), Wayne Vermaak (guitar), and Billy Duncanson (drums).

Background
When Peter Coyne fired the entire previous Godfathers lineup in 2019, he quickly assembled a new band consisting of bassist Jon Priestley, guitarists Richie Simpson and Wayne Vermaak, and drummer Billy Duncanson. They soon began touring and writing new songs, resulting in the double A-side single "I'm Not Your Slave"/"Wild and Free" on 17 June 2020. Due to the COVID-19 lockdowns, the album was recorded in separate stages with three or four songs at a time at Jon Priestley's Abatis Studios in Honiley, Warwickshire, until the album began to take shape and was completed. This delayed the album's release by 18 months, according to Peter Coyne. Alpha Beta Gamma Delta was released on 16 September 2022 through the band's own label, Godfathers Recordings.

The four-track Midnight Rider EP was released ahead of the album on 26 August 2022, and included its title track and "OCD" – both taken from Alpha Beta Gamma Delta – and the two non-album tracks "When the Cowards Fall" and "Fade Away".

Critical reception

The album was well received by critics. Ged Babey of Louder Than War wrote that "for a band of this vintage who adhere to traditional ideas of how rock'n'roll should sound, it is a cracking album. It's melodic, mature, varied, the band still crank out songs of controlled rage, but can pull off gentler numbers too when they need to." John Clarkson of Pennyblackmusic called it "one of the highlights of the Godfathers' lengthy career," and Julian Marszalek of Classic Rock stated it was their best album since 1991's Unreal World, writing, "through a combination of hard riffing, melodicism and Priestley's cranked-up production, the Godfathers deliver with a sincerity that's utterly palpable throughout." Über Röck's Jim Rowland described it as "slick, punchy and crammed with very well written, catchy tunes," and added, "Whilst much of it is upbeat with quite a commercial sheen in places, you can still rest assured that lyrically much of it still sits in an altogether darker place."

Track listing

Personnel
Adapted from the album liner notes.

The Godfathers
Peter Coyne – vocals
Jon Priestley – bass, electric guitar, acoustic guitar, keyboards, backing vocals
Wayne Vermaak – electric guitar, acoustic guitar, backing vocals
Richie Simpson – electric guitar, backing vocals
Billy Duncanson – drums, backing vocals
Technical personnel
Jon Priestley – producer, engineer, mixing
James Livett – mastering
Jaime Martin – artwork
Simon Balaam – band photography

References

2022 albums
The Godfathers albums